Northern Frontier is a 1935 American adventure film directed by Sam Newfield and written by Barry Barringer. The film stars Kermit Maynard, Eleanor Hunt, Russell Hopton, J. Farrell MacDonald, LeRoy Mason, Gertrude Astor, Ben Hendricks Jr. and Lloyd Ingraham. The film was released on February 1, 1935, by Ambassador Pictures.

Plot

Cast           
Kermit Maynard as Mack MacKenzie
Eleanor Hunt as Beth Braden
Russell Hopton as Duke Milford
J. Farrell MacDonald as Inspector McKenzie
LeRoy Mason as Stone 
Gertrude Astor as Mae
Ben Hendricks Jr. as Sam Keene
Walter Brennan as Cook
Lloyd Ingraham as Prof. Braden
Nelson McDowell as Barfly Tope
Lafe McKee as Old Trapper

References

External links
 

1935 films
1930s English-language films
American adventure films
1935 adventure films
Films directed by Sam Newfield
Films based on novels by James Oliver Curwood
American black-and-white films
1930s American films